The Order of the Star of Jordan (Wisam al-Kawkab al-Urduni) or The Order of Hussein ibn Ali (Wisam al-Hussein ibn Ali) is an award and military decoration of the sovereign state of Jordan and is awarded for military or civil merit. It was founded in honour of his father, by King Abdullah I on 22 June 1949. The Grand Cordon class was introduced by Hussein of Jordan on 23 September 1967. It is awarded to members of the Royal Family (Hashemite) in two classes (1. Qiladat al-Hussein ibn Ali – Collar: awarded to Heads of State, and 2. Grand Cordon: awarded to consorts of heads of state, senior Jordanian and foreign princes and princesses). The award possesses 5 Grades; (Grand Cordon, Grand Officer, Commander, Officer and Knight) plus a medal. These may be awarded to anyone deserving. A Ribbon is issued for members of the military; Dark green with narrow purple edge stripes. Recipients use the postnomials SJ which are altered depending on the class awarded; GCSJ for Grand Cordon; GOSJ for Grand officer; CSJ for Commander; OSJ for Officer; and KSJ for Knight.

Al-Kawkab Al-Urduni is a transliteration of (الكوكب الأردني), a name given to a shield (trophy) that is given in Jordan. It is usually given by Head of state King Abdullah to reward extraordinary achievements, usually by military officials and other officials. It is given in a ceremony on the Independence Day of Jordan, 25 May.

Grades 

The Order of the Star of Jordan is divided in five classes:

Notable recipients

The Order of the Star is awarded to members of the Hashemites (the Royal Family) by convention. While others are often Royalty of other states, the Order of the Star is also considered a military award, as such, members of the Jordanian military are believed to have been awarded the order, however no reliable source confirms this.

Grand Cordon

Jordanians 
 Prince Ali bin Al Hussein (formerly Grand Officer)
 Prince Faisal bin Al Hussein (formerly Grand Officer)
 Prince Ghazi bin Muhammad (formerly Officer)
 Prince Hamzah bin Al Hussein
 Prince Hashim bin Al Hussein (formerly Grand Officer)
 Prince Hassan bin Talal (formerly Commander)
 Prince Muhammad bin Talal
 Princess Alia bint Hussein
 Princess Noor Hamzah
 Amer Khammash
 Tawfiq Kreishan
 Samir Rifai
 Faisal al-Fayez
 Abdullah Ensour
 Khaled Toukan
 Bisher Al-Khasawneh

Foreigners 
 Lieutenant General Sudharmono, Vice President of Indonesia
 Air Marshal Rahim Khan
 Margrethe II of Denmark
 General Muhammad Zia-ul-Haq
 Muhammad Zafarullah Khan
 Queen Beatrix of the Netherlands
 Queen Elizabeth II of the United Kingdom
 Prince Edward, Duke of Kent
 Princess Astrid of Norway
 Prince Carl Philip of Sweden, Duke of Värmland (2003)
 Princess Madeleine of Sweden, Duchess of Hälsingland and Gästrikland (2003)
 Princess Lilian of Sweden, Duchess of Halland (2003)
 Infanta Elena, Duchess of Lugo
 Syedna Mohammed Burhanuddin
 Colonel Timoor Daghistani
 Lt. Col Muhammad Iqbal Sarfraz, Commanding Officer 75 Lt Anti Aircraft Regiment (Katiba Mujahid), Pakistan Army. Awarded to the regiment in 1971.

Grand Officer
 Faisal bin Abdulaziz Al Saud

Commander
 ....

Officer
 Prince Asem bin Al Nayef
 Prince Rashid bin El Hassan
 Prince Talal bin Muhammad

Knight
 Hussein, Crown Prince of Jordan

References

Star of Jordan, Order of
Star of Jordan, Order of the
Awards established in 1949
1949 establishments in Jordan